Sensors is a monthly peer-reviewed, open access, scientific journal that is published by MDPI. It was established in June 2001. The editors-in-chief are Vittorio M.N. Passaro, Assefa M. Melesse, Alexander Star, Eduard Llobet, Guillermo Villanueva and Davide Brunelli. Sensors covers research on all aspects of sensors and biosensors. The journal publishes original research articles, short notes, review articles, book reviews, product reviews, and announcements related to academia.

Abstracting and indexing  
This journal is indexed in the following databases:

According to the Journal Citation Reports, the journal has a 2020 impact factor of 3.576.

References

External links  
 

Engineering journals
Open access journals
Publications established in 2001
MDPI academic journals
Biweekly journals
English-language journals
Physics journals